Augusto is an underground metro station that serves Line 6 on the Naples Metro. It was opened on 4 February 2007 as part of the inaugural section of Line 6 between Mergellina and Mostra.

Augusto Station, which has two tracks and loops, is situated on one of Naples' busiest streets and most densely populated neighbourhoods. It is considered among the stations of the Craft as it houses works by Bruno Scognamiglio and Crespo.

The previous station is Lala, the next is Mostra.

References

See also
Railway stations in Italy
List of Naples metro stations

Naples Metro stations
2007 establishments in Italy
Railway stations opened in 2007
Railway stations in Italy opened in the 21st century